The canton of Bogny-sur-Meuse is an administrative division of the Ardennes department, northern France. It was created at the French canton reorganisation which came into effect in March 2015. Its seat is in Bogny-sur-Meuse.

It consists of the following communes:

Bogny-sur-Meuse
Deville
Haulmé
Les Hautes-Rivières
Joigny-sur-Meuse
Laifour
Les Mazures
Montcornet
Monthermé
Renwez
Thilay
Tournavaux

References

Cantons of Ardennes (department)